Mr. Gay World India is a national beauty pageant that selects its winner to represent India at gay pageants globally notably to the annual Mr Gay World. The National Director and Producer of the organization is the 2014 winner, Sushant Divgikar. The Assistant Managers are Sanket Sveronic and Darshil of the organization.

The inception of the pageant happened in 2008 when Zoltan Parag was crowned the first Mr. Gay India. The event received media attention heavily when popular model and reality star Sushant Divgikar won the pageant in 2014. Subsequently, the pageant which at first was irregular is now held annually in Mumbai.

History
Zoltan Parag was the first ever winner of Mr. Gay India he represented India at International Mr Gay Competition in 2008.

Mr. Gay India got tremendous national and international recognition only after Nolan Lewis from Mumbai made it to the top 10 at the Mr. Gay World pageant in 2013. He paved way for the next winner, Sushant Divgikar, who went on to represent India in 2014 in Rome.

Sushant Divgikar broke all existing records by a splendid performance at the Mr. Gay World pageant in Rome that year and won 3 individual sub awards as well as the team sports sub award alongside delegates from Iceland, Indonesia and Hong Kong. He won 3 individual sub awards viz. Mr.Gay World Congeniality, Mr.Gay World People's Choice and Mr.Gay World Art challenge. Sushant made it to the top 10 but did not succeed in bringing his home country the crown.

In 2015, Sushant was announced the National Producer and Director for India and was in charge of the Indian leg of the pageant, making him the youngest National producer in the pageant's history while also being the reigning Mr.Gay INDIA at the time. Sushant continued his reign for a record, two years and represented not only the gay community but also the entire LGBT community in India's biggest celebrity reality show, Bigg Boss in its eighth season.

first contestant from Odisha to win the crown. Anwesh Sahoo represented India in Malta, Europe for Mr.Gay World 2016 and made it to the top 12. In 2017 Darshan Mandhana won the Mr Gay India 2017 crown and represented India at Mr Gay World 2017 where he made to top 10.
In 2018 , Samarpan Maiti of West Bengal bagged the coveted Mr. Gay India title and represented India at the Mr. Gay World Pageant in Knysna , South Africa , making it to the top 3 (2nd runner up) spot , a feat that was not conquered previously by any other representatives from India. 

In 2019 , Suresh Ramadas , hailing from Bangalore , Karnataka took over as The new Mr. Gay India, beating probably one of the best line up of finalists in the National Pageant to further represent India at the Mr. Gay World Pageant in South Africa where he made it to the top 10 mega finalists and kept India’s record of always making it to the top 10 Finalists in the world. 
India has been one of the only countries to have consecutively made it to the top 10 spot , a feat very few countries have achieved in the Mr. Gay World Pageant’s history. 

In early 2020 , Ramdas passed on his crown and his impressive reign to Shyam Konnur who is the current title holder of Mr. Gay India and was supposed to represent the country at the Mr. Gay World pageant in South Africa in May of 2020 but unfortunately , this was not possible due to the novel corona virus pandemic outbreak around the world. 
The Mr. Gay world organisation decided to postpone if not cancel the pageant for the year 2020 and hold a special showing for National winners from around the world to compete at the international level in 2021.

Representatives to Mister Gay World
Color key

References

External links
mrgayworldindiaofficial.in (Official Website) 

Beauty pageants in India
LGBT events in India
LGBT beauty pageants
Male beauty pageants
2008 establishments in Maharashtra
Recurring events established in 2008
Indian awards
Mr Gay World